Oldervika or Oldervik is a village in the municipality of Rødøy in Nordland county, Norway.  The village is located on the eastern shore of the Sørfjorden, just north of the village of Sørfjorden.  Although it is located on the mainland, there are no road connections to the rest of Norway.  It has a ferry connection to Kilboghamn to the west and Jektvika to the north.

References

Rødøy
Villages in Nordland
Populated places of Arctic Norway